Kalangi Nathar was an Indian ascetic who belonged to both the natha tradition of northern India and the siddha tradition of southern India. He was the guru of saint Bhogar and was born in Varanasi and belonged to the ancient tradition of nava (nine) nātha sadhus (holy ascetics), tracing their tradition to Shiva.

He is associated with the Kanjamalai hill in southern India and is often referred to us "Kanjamalai Siddhar". He attained mukti on this hill, near Kanchipuram, where his samadhi, now known as the Sidhhar Kovil temple, is still located. The hill is found in Sivathapuram a small village, 12 km away from Salem, India, enroute to Elampillai. The temple is also associated with Kali and Murugan.

Biography
According to Bhogar's poems Kalangi was his father, which would mean that he was from the Porkollar (goldsmith) or the Vishwakarma caste.

Boghar glorifies Kalangi in many of his verses. Kalangi and Bhogar were considered to possess an ideal master and student relationship. It is said that they had a mutual spiritual progresses. Kalangi especially took care of the spiritual advancement of his disciple Bhogar and was behind Bhogar's development and innovations.

Kalangi stayed in Sathuragiri Hills and in Pothigai hills and is believed to have controlled wild animals with mantras. Kalangi is known for his tall physique and was an expert in the art of breath control (vaasi yogam).

He was the disciple of the great siddhar Tirumular. He is one among the seven disciples whom Tirumular bestowed his knowledge, the other six being Indran, Soman, Rudhran, Kanduru, Brahman, and Kanjamalaiyan.

Identification with other saints

Kamalamuni
Kalangi Nathar is often believed to be the same as the saint Kamalamuni. In the 63rd song of Kamalamuni Suthiram 76, a line states "Kamalamuni alias Kalangi".

The following information is available about Sri Kamalamuni in the book Bogar 7000 written by Bhogar.
Song 5729: Kamalamuni was born in the Tamil month of Vaikasi (May — June), his birth star being the second part of Poosam.
Song 5725: The siddhar named Kamalamuni belongs to Kuravar caste. He lived for six-eight generations.
Song 5841: Kamalamuni is 4000 years and some 300 odd (days) old. He lived in China for a long time.

However, Karuvurar in his book Vadha Kaviyam (song 584) says that "Maamuni" belonged to the "Kannar" caste. He does not explicitly say "Kamalamuni", but only mentions the name of "Maamuni". It is not clearly known whether Karuvurar refers to Kamalamuni or not.

In Bhogar Janana Sasthra, it is mentioned that Kamalamuni attained samadhi at Madurai. It is believed that siddhar Kamalamuni attained samadhi at Thiruvarur.

Confucius
He is believed to have lived in China and to have spread the knowledge of yoga and varma kalai (acupuncture) to the Chinese people. As such, in India he is identified with Confucius while his disciple Bhogar is identified with Laozi.

Notes

References

External links 
 Bhogar. Palani.org.

Indian Hindu saints
Indian expatriates in China
Confucius
Tamil Hindu saints
Scholars from Varanasi
People from Salem, Tamil Nadu
People from Kanchipuram district
Gurus
Indian Shaivite religious leaders
Navnath
Indian yogis
Indian Hindu missionaries
Hindu sages